Howard Smoot, known as Dan Smoot (October 5, 1913 –July 24, 2003), was a Federal Bureau of Investigation agent and a conservative political activist. From 1957 to 1971, he published The Dan Smoot Report, which chronicled alleged communist infiltration in various sectors of American government and society.

Background
Smoot was unsuccessful in his campaign for public office, but he rose to fame as a pundit on radio and television. He initially served as the spokesperson and face of H.L. Hunt's Facts Forum before leaving to create his own.

Departure from the FBI

Spreading his conservative message

In 1962, Smoot wrote The Invisible Government concerning early members of the Council on Foreign Relations. Other books include The Hope of the World; The Business End of Government; and his autobiography, People Along the Way. Additionally he was associated with Robert W. Welch, Jr.'s John Birch Society and wrote for the society's American Opinion bi-monthly magazine.

In 1972, Smoot served as campaign manager for American Independent Party presidential candidate John G. Schmitz.

Books
 The Hope of the World (1958)
 The Invisible Government (1962)
 The Business End of Government (1973)
 People Along the Way: The Autobiography of Dan Smoot (1993)

References

Further reading
 Hendershot, Heather. What's Fair on the Air? Cold War Right-Wing Broadcasting and the Public Interest (University of Chicago Press; 2011) 260 pages; covers the rise and fall of prominent far-right radio hosts: H. L. Hunt, Dan Smoot, Carl McIntire, and Billy James Hargis.

External links
 
 
 FBI file on Dan Smoot
The Dan Smoot Report

1913 births
2003 deaths
People from Mississippi County, Missouri
Southern Methodist University alumni
Harvard University alumni
Federal Bureau of Investigation agents
American male journalists
20th-century American journalists
American political writers
American radio personalities
People from Dallas
People from Tyler, Texas
John Birch Society members
American conspiracy theorists
Conservatism in the United States
American anti-communists
Television personalities from Texas